Laura Ucrós Téllez (born 13 June 1995 in Bogotá) is a Colombian tennis player.

On 21 January 2013 Ucrós reached her best Junior World ranking of 32. She has a 1–1 record for Colombia in Fed Cup competition.

In August 2020 Ucrós started her Master in Business Administration (MBA) at Harvard Business School.

ITF finals (0–1)

Doubles (0–1)

References

External links 
 
 
 

1995 births
Living people
Sportspeople from Bogotá
Colombian female tennis players
Harvard Business School alumni
21st-century Colombian women